2nd district may refer to:

Australia 
 2nd Military District (Australia)

Hungary 
 2nd district of Budapest

Japan 
 Aomori 2nd district
 Aomori 2nd district (1947–1993)
 Hyogo 2nd district
 Ishikawa 2nd district
 Kagawa 2nd district
 Kagoshima 2nd district
 Kanagawa 2nd district
 Kumamoto 2nd district
 Kyoto 2nd district
 Kyoto 2nd district (1947–93)
 Nagasaki 2nd district
 Nara 2nd district
 Okinawa 2nd district
 Tokyo 2nd district
 Tokyo 2nd district (1928–42)
 Tokyo 2nd district (1947–93)
 Tochigi 2nd district
 Yamaguchi 2nd district
 Yamaguchi 2nd district (1928–42)

Philippines 
 2nd District of Agusan del Norte
 2nd District of Manila
 2nd District of Rizal
 Albay's 2nd congressional district
 Batangas's 2nd congressional district
 Bohol's 2nd congressional district
 Bulacan's 2nd congressional district
 Cagayan's 2nd congressional district
 Cavite's 2nd congressional district
 Cebu's 2nd congressional district
 Ilocos Sur's 2nd congressional district
 Iloilo's 2nd congressional district
 La Union's 2nd congressional district
 Laguna's 2nd congressional district
 Leyte's 2nd congressional district
 Negros Occidental's 2nd congressional district
 Negros Oriental's 2nd congressional district
 Nueva Ecija's 2nd congressional district
 Pampanga's 2nd congressional district
 Pangasinan's 2nd congressional district
 Quezon City's 2nd congressional district
 Quezon's 2nd congressional district
 Rizal's 2nd congressional district
 Samar's 2nd congressional district
 Sorsogon's 2nd congressional district
 Tarlac's 2nd congressional district

Turkey 
 Ankara (2nd electoral district)
 Bursa (2nd electoral district), an electoral district of Turkey
 Istanbul (2nd electoral district)
 İzmir (2nd electoral district)

United States

Legislative districts 
 Alabama's 2nd congressional district
 Arkansas's 2nd congressional district
 Arizona's 2nd congressional district
 Arizona's 2nd legislative district
 California's 2nd district (disambiguation)
 California's 2nd congressional district
 California's 2nd State Assembly district
 California's 2nd State Senate district
 Colorado's 2nd congressional district
 Colorado's 2nd Senate district
 Connecticut's 2nd congressional district
 Florida's 2nd congressional district
Georgia's 2nd congressional district
Georgia's 2nd Senate district
 Hawaii's 2nd congressional district
 Idaho's 2nd congressional district
 Indiana's 2nd congressional district
 Iowa's 2nd congressional district
 Illinois's 2nd congressional district
 Kansas's 2nd congressional district
 Kentucky's 2nd congressional district
 Louisiana's 2nd congressional district
 Maine's 2nd congressional district
 Maryland's 2nd congressional district
 Massachusetts's 2nd congressional district
 Michigan's 2nd congressional district
 Michigan's 2nd House of Representatives district
 Michigan's 2nd Senate district
 Minnesota's 2nd congressional district
 Mississippi's 2nd congressional district
 Missouri's 2nd congressional district
 Nebraska's 2nd congressional district
 Nevada's 2nd congressional district
 New Hampshire's 2nd congressional district
 New Jersey's 2nd congressional district
 2nd Legislative District (New Jersey)
 New Mexico's 2nd congressional district
 New York's 2nd congressional district
 North Carolina's 2nd congressional district
 Oklahoma's 2nd congressional district
 Ohio's 2nd congressional district
 Ohio's 2nd senatorial district
 Oregon's 2nd congressional district
 Pennsylvania's 2nd congressional district
 Rhode Island's 2nd congressional district
 South Carolina's 2nd congressional district
 Tennessee's 2nd congressional district
 Texas's 2nd congressional district
 Utah's 2nd congressional district
 Utah's 2nd State Senate district
 Virginia's 2nd congressional district
 West Virginia's 2nd congressional district
 Wisconsin's 2nd congressional district

Other uses 
 2nd District of Columbia Infantry Regiment, an infantry unit during the American Civil War

See also 
 
 District 2 (disambiguation)